Marcos Arantes (born 25 July 1964) is a Brazilian rower. He competed in the men's coxless four event at the 1988 Summer Olympics.

References

External links
 

1964 births
Living people
Brazilian male rowers
Olympic rowers of Brazil
Rowers at the 1988 Summer Olympics
Place of birth missing (living people)
Pan American Games medalists in rowing
Rowers at the 1991 Pan American Games
Pan American Games bronze medalists for Brazil
Medalists at the 1991 Pan American Games